Power of Love is the thirty-second studio album by American country music artist Charley Pride. It was released in August 1984 via RCA Records. The album includes the singles "The Power of Love" and "Missin' Mississippi"

Track listing

Chart performance

References

1984 albums
Charley Pride albums
Albums produced by Norro Wilson
RCA Records albums